Count Michał Tyszkiewicz (Lithuanian: Mykolas Tiškevičius; 4 December 1828, in Wołożyn – 18 November 1897, in Rome) was a Polish-Lithuanian nobleman collector of antiquities and amateur Egyptologist. He was a member of the Polish Tyszkiewicz family.

He first excavated at Luxor in 1861–1862 and revisited Egypt in 1867–1868, building up a collection during his travels. 
It is now split between different locations in Lithuania, Paris, London, Copenhagen, Berlin, Boston, Rome, and the Tyszkiewicz Palace at Lahojsk, Belarus. A small part of it remains in Poland in the National Museum in Warsaw.

Writings
Diary of a Journey to Egypt and Nubia, Paris 1863.
Memories of an old collector, translated into English by Mrs. Andrew Lang. Longmans, Green, London 1898.

References

19th-century Polish archaeologists
Polish art collectors
Lithuanian archaeologists
Michal
1828 births
1897 deaths
People from Valozhyn